The Bernon Worsted Mill is an historic textile mill at 828 Park Avenue in Woonsocket, Rhode Island. It was built in 1919 by Charles Augustus Proulx, and was operated as a producer of specialty custom worsted wool yarns, in what was then a sparsely populated part of the city. The building saw somewhat regular use in the manufacture of textiles until 2004.

The mill was added to the National Register of Historic Places in 2005. It was renovated into condominiums in 2005 known as the "Red Mill Lofts."

See also
National Register of Historic Places listings in Providence County, Rhode Island

References

Residential buildings completed in 1919
Industrial buildings and structures on the National Register of Historic Places in Rhode Island
Buildings and structures in Woonsocket, Rhode Island
National Register of Historic Places in Providence County, Rhode Island